The Arbalète sauterelle type A, or simply Sauterelle ( French for grasshopper), was a bomb-throwing crossbow used by French and British forces on the Western Front during World War I. It was designed to throw a hand grenade in a high trajectory into enemy trenches. It was initially dismissed by the French Army but General Henri Berthelot thought it had practical value.

It was lighter and more portable than the Leach Trench Catapult, but less powerful.

The Sauterelle replaced the Leach Catapult in British service until they were replaced in 1916 by the 2 inch Medium Trench Mortar and Stokes mortar.

References

Crossbows
Projectile weapons
World War I French infantry weapons
World War I British infantry weapons
Grenade launchers